Chughadun (also Romanized as Chūghādūn, Chūqādūn, Chaqādūn, and Choghādūn) is a village in Heshmatabad Rural District, in the Central District of Dorud County, Lorestan Province, Iran. At the 2006 census, its population was 355, in 85 families.

References 

Towns and villages in Dorud County